Gettin' It (Album Number Ten) is the tenth studio album by American rapper Too Short. It was released on May 21, 1996 via Jive Records, making it his seventh album on the label. This was his final album before going on a brief career hiatus, and was certified platinum on July 26, 1996. It peaked in the Top 5 in the Billboard 200, while becoming the third number-one album for the artist on the Top R&B Albums chart.

The album's production and lyrical content more or less reflect the domination of gangsta rap and G-funk through the West Coast, and somewhat strays from Too $hort's sex and pimping themes.

Track listing

Charts

Weekly charts

Year-end charts

See also
List of number-one R&B albums of 1996 (U.S.)

References

Too Short albums
1996 albums
Albums produced by Ant Banks
Jive Records albums
Gangsta rap albums by American artists
G-funk albums